Khazhi-Yurt (Ẋaƶi-Yurt), also known by Russian name Pervomayskoye, is a rural locality (a selo) in Vedensky District, Chechnya.

Administrative and municipal status 
Municipally, Khazhi-Yurt is incorporated into Guninsky rural settlement. It is one of the four settlements included in it.

Geography 

Khazhi-Yurt is located in the mountainous forest zone of Vedensky District.

The nearest settlements to Khazhi-Yurt are Guni and Marzoy-Mokhk in the north-east, Agishbatoy and Mesedoy in the south-east, Zelamkhin-Kotar in the south, Tsa-Vedeno in the west, and Benoy in the north-west.

History 
The village has a number of holy places associated with the life of Kunta-haji.

In 1944, after the genocide and deportation of the Chechen and Ingush people and the Chechen-Ingush ASSR was abolished, the village of Khazhi-Yurt (then Khazhi-Aul) was renamed to Pervomayskoye, and settled by people from the neighboring republic of Dagestan. From 1944 to 1957, it was a part of the Vedensky District of the Dagestan ASSR.

After the Vaynakh people returned and the Chechen-Ingush ASSR was restored, the village did not regain its former name, and kept the name Pervomaiskoye.

In 2009, the Chechen parliament renamed the village to Khazhi-Yurt, as part of the program "Culture of the Chechen Republic, 2008-2011". The Russian government did not recognize the name change, but the village is known by many today as Khazhi-Yurt.

Population 
 1990 Census: 587
 2002 Census: 479
 2010 Census: 734
 2019 estimate: ?

According to the results of the 2010 Census, the majority of residents of Khazhi-Yurt were ethnic Chechens.

References 

Rural localities in Vedensky District